Eduardo Schwank was the defending champion, but decided to not play this year.
5th seed Éric Prodon defeated qualifier Fernando Romboli 6–3, 4–6, 6–1 in the final.

Seeds

Draw

Finals

Top half

Bottom half

References
 Main Draw
 Qualifying Draw

Seguros Bolivar Open Bucaramanga - Singles
2011 Singles